The 2016 Canterbury local elections were part of the wider 2016 New Zealand local elections, to elect members to sub-national councils and boards. The Canterbury elections cover one regional council (Environment Canterbury), nine territorial authority (city and district) councils, two district health boards, and various local boards and licensing trusts.

Environment Canterbury

Christchurch constituency (4)

North Canterbury constituency (1)

Mid-Canterbury constituency (1)

South Canterbury constituency (1)

Kaikoura District Council

Mayor

Winston Gray
Ted Howard
Darlene Borgan
Neil Pablecheque

Councillors (7)

Tony Blunt
Lisa Bond
John Diver
Celeste Harnett
Julie Howden
Craig Mackle
Derrick Millton
Neil Pablecheque

Hurunui District Council

Mayor
Incumbent mayor Winton Dalley was re-elected unopposed.

Councillors – Amuri-Hurunui ward (3)

Nicky Anderson
Marie Balck
Dick Davidson
Sue Turnbull

Councillors – Amberley ward (3)

Julie Coster
Judith McKendry
Julia Mclean
Kevin Roche
Geoff Shier
Michael Ward

Councillors – Hanmer Springs ward (1)
Jason Fletch
Chris Hughey

Councillors – Cheviot ward (1)
Incumbent councillor Vince Daly was re-elected unopposed.

Councillors – Glenmark ward (1)
Incumbent councillor Fiona Harris was re-elected unopposed.

Waimakariri District Council

Mayor
David Ayers
Natalie Leary

Councillors – Rangiora-Ashley ward (4)

Peter Allen
Kirstyn Barnett
Robbie Brine
Dan Gordon
Chris Gunn
Chris Prickett
Beverly Shepherd Wright
Linda Stewart
Paul Williams

Councillors – Kaiapoi-Woodend ward (4)

Andrea Allen
Neville Atkinson
Al Blackie
Rick Cable
Brent Cairns
Elsie Ellison
Peter Farrant
John Meyer
Hugh Mould
Shona Powell
Sandra Stewart

Councillors – Oxford-Ohoka ward (2)

Phillip Coleman
Gideon Couper
Wendy Doody
Kevin Felstead
Thomas Robson

Christchurch City Council
The Christchurch City Council significantly redrew its ward boundaries for the 2016 election, taking to account population changes since the 2011 Christchurch earthquake.

Mayor

Lianne Dalziel
Tubby Hansen
John Minto

Councillors – Harewood ward (1)

Faimeh Burke
Rod D Cameron
Rod S Cameron
Brian Gargiulo
Aaron Keown

Councillors – Waimairi ward (1)
Raf Manji
Anthony Rimell

Councillors – Papanui ward (1)
Mike Davidson
John Stringer

Councillors – Fendalton ward (1)
Incumbent Fendalton-Waimari councillor Jamie Gough was elected unopposed.

Councillors – Innes ward (1)
Pauline Cotter
Mel Rodricks

Councillors – Burwood ward (1)
Cruize Erueti
Glenn Livingstone

Councillors – Coastal ward (1)

David East
Jo Kane
Dean Lester

Councillors – Hornby ward (1)

Tane Apanui
Jimmy Chen
Sara Harnett Kikstra
Manjit Singh

Councillors – Halswell ward (1)

Kevin Clarke
Anne Galloway
Chrys Horn
Peter Laloli

Councillors – Riccarton ward (1)
Incumbent Riccarton-Wigram councillor and deputy mayor Vicki Buck was elected unopposed.

Councillors – Spreydon ward (1)
Phil Clearwater
Patricia Siataga

Councillors – Central ward (1)

Lindon Boyce
Dora Langsbury
Deon Swiggs
Vicki Tahau-Paton

Councillors – Cashmere ward (1)
Incumbent Spreydon-Heathcote councillor Tim Scandrett was elected unopposed.

Councillors – Linwood ward (1)

Alexandra Davids
Yani Johanson
Scott Toomey

Councillors – Heathcote ward (1)

Malcom Davis
Paul Lonsdale
Sara Templeton

Councillors – Banks Peninsula ward (1)
Incumbent councillor Andrew Turner was re-elected unopposed.

Selwyn District Council

Mayor

Sam Broughton
Debra Hasson
Pat McEvedy
Sarah Walters
Bill Woods

Councillors – Selwyn Central ward (4)

Mark Alexander
Jeff Bland
Peter Hill
Nicole Reid
Craig Watson

Councillors – Springs ward (3)

Debra Hasson
Malcolm Lyall
Chris Martin
Grant Miller
Tony Palmer

Councillors – Malvern ward (2)

John Morten
Robert Mugford
Kerry Pauling
Bill Woods

Councillors – Ellesmere ward (2)

Diane Chesmer
Murray Lemon
Pat McEvedy
Harry Schat

Ashburton District Council

Mayor
Donna Favel
Angus McKay

Councillors – Ashburton ward (7)

Marion Bartlett
Thelma Bell
Leen Braam
Neil Brown
Russell Ellis
Donna Favel
Edward Gates
Marie Hibbert
Selwyn Price
Diane Rawlinson
Richard Sampson
Ash Shah
Alasdair Urquhart

Councillors – Eastern ward (3)

Peter Harrison
Lynette Lovett
Mark Malcolm
Stuart Wilson

Councillors – Western ward (2)

Tammy Dickson
Liz McMillan
Peter Reveley

Timaru District Council

Mayor
Damon Odey
Phil Smith

Councillors – Timaru ward (6)

Jock Anderson
Anthony Brien
Peter Burt
Dave Jack
Owen Jackson
Andrea Leslie
Ken Linscott
Sally Parker
Garry Simpson
Tracy Tierney
Steve Wills
Graeme Wilson
Heather Woolstencroft

Councillors – Pleasant Point-Temuka ward (2)

Richard Lyon
Paddy O'Reilly
Roger Payne

Councillors – Geraldine ward (1)
McGregor Simpson
Kerry Stevens

Mackenzie District Council

Mayor
James Leslie
Graham Smith

Councillors – Pukaki ward (3)

Russell Armstrong
Geoff Gabites
Paul Hannagan
James Leslie
Stella Sweney

Councillors – Opuha ward (3)

John Allen
Warren Barker
Stuart Barwood
Judy Christopher
Chris Clarke
Noel Jackson
Robbie MacMillan
Anne Munro

Waimate District Council

Mayor
Craig Rowley
Stuart Thompson

Councillors – Waimate ward (4)

Lyndsey Bishop
Sharyn Cain
Peter Collins
Miriam Morton
David Owen

Councillors – Pareora-Otaio-Makikihi ward (2)

David Anderson
Ken Batchelor
Tom O'Connor

Councillors – Hakataramea-Waihaorunga ward (1)
Jakki Guilford was elected unopposed.

Councillors – Lower Waihao ward (1)
Incumbent councillor Sheila Paul was re-elected unopposed.

References

Canterbury
Politics of Canterbury, New Zealand